The Cabinet of The Gambia is responsible for advising the President of The Gambia and for carrying out other functions as prescribed by law. It is composed of the President, the Vice-President, and the Secretaries of State. It is responsible for regulating the procedure of its own meetings and is held accountable for its actions by the National Assembly, according to Sections 74 and 75 of the Constitution of The Gambia.

The current Cabinet of The Gambia is the Cabinet of Adama Barrow, led by President Adama Barrow.

Cabinet ministers 
According to Section 71 (2) of the Constitution of The Gambia, a person cannot serve as a Minister in the Cabinet of The Gambia if they are a member of the National Assembly or hold the citizenship of any other country. In addition, the Attorney General must have been a member of the Gambian bar for at least five years prior to their appointment.

Cabinet ministers are appointed directly by the President of The Gambia and must swear an oath before assuming the functions of their office. The office of a cabinet minister becomes vacant following the assumption of office by a new President, by the revoking of their appointment by the sitting President, by their resignation or by their death. Section 71 (5) also states that if there is a vote of censure against a cabinet minister by the National Assembly, the President will also revoke their appointment.

Roles 

 President
 Vice-President/Minister of Women's Affairs
 Minister of Defence
 Minister of Foreign Affairs
 Minister of Finance and Economic Affairs
 Minister of Tourism and Culture
 Minister of Higher Education, Research, Science and Technology
 Minister of Basic and Secondary Education
 Minister of Health and Social Welfare
 Minister of Agriculture
 Minister of Trade, Industry, Regional Integration and Employment
 Minister of Forestry, Environment, Climate Change and Natural Resources
 Minister of Fisheries, Water Resources and National Assembly Matters
 Minister of Energy and Petroleum
 Minister of Lands and Regional Government
 Minister of Justice/Attorney General
 Minister of Information and Communication Infrastructure
 Minister of the Interior
 Minister of Youth and Sports
 Minister of Transport, Works and Infrastructure

Current composition

Vice-President
Minister of Women's Affairs
Minister of Defence[3]
Minister of Foreign Affairs
Minister of Finance and Economic Affairs
Minister of Tourism and Culture
Minister of Higher Education, Research, Science and Technology
Minister of Basic and Secondary Education
Minister of Health and Social Welfare
Minister of Agriculture
Minister of Trade, Industry, Regional Integration and Employment
Minister of Forestry, Environment, Climate Change and Natural Resources
Minister of Fisheries, Water Resources and National Assembly Matters
Minister of Energy and Petroleum
Minister of Lands and Regional Government
Minister of Justice/Attorney General
Minister of Information and Communication Infrastructure
Minister of the Interior
Minister of Youth and Sports
Minister of Transport, Works and Infrastructure

Notes

References

Government of the Gambia
Gambia
Politics of the Gambia
Political organisations based in the Gambia